Qishta, also known as kishta, kashta , ghishta, or ashta, is a dairy coagulated milk product prepared from heated fresh milk and consumed as a dessert. It is sometimes scented with orange flower water.

See also 
 Clotted cream
 Kaymak
 Malai
 List of cheeses
 List of dairy products

References 

Dairy products